Splendor  is a 1989  Italian drama film directed by  Ettore Scola.

Plot
Jordan (Marcello Mastroianni) runs a struggling cinema called Splendor in a small town in Italy. Low ticket sales mean that the cinema is no longer a viable business, and Jordan reflects on his experiences running Splendor, from his arrival in the town as a child with his father. He meets French showgirl Chantal (Marina Vlady) at one of her performances, and she comes to work for him as an usher. Cinephile Luigi (Massimo Troisi) repeatedly attends screenings of Il Sorpasso in order to see Chantal, with whom he is besotted, and after a brief fling he begins working for Jordan as the projectionist. Attendance at the cinema decreases with the rise of television and Jordan considers bringing in strippers to try to solve his financial problems. Throughout are seen clips of the films shown at the cinema: Metropolis, It’s a Wonderful Life, La Grande Guerra, Amarcord, amongst others.

Cast
 Marcello Mastroianni as Jordan
 Massimo Troisi as Luigi
 Marina Vlady as Chantal Duvivier
 Paolo Panelli as Mr. Paolo
 Pamela Villoresi as Eugenia
 Giacomo Piperno as Lo Fazio

Awards
 1989 Cannes Film Festival Official Selection
 Nastro d'Argento Best Cinematography (Luciano Tovoli)

References

External links
 

1989 films
1989 drama films
Films directed by Ettore Scola
Films set in a movie theatre
Films set in Lazio
Italian drama films
Self-reflexive films
Films with screenplays by Ettore Scola
1980s Italian films